Élisabeth-Céleste Venard, countess of Chabrillan (27 December 1824 – 18 February 1909), better known by her stage name Céleste Mogador and often referred to simply as Mogador, was a French dancer and writer.

Life and career 
The daughter of Anne-Victoire Vénard, she was born in Paris, France, on 27 December 1824. She states in her autobiography that her father died when she was six, though her book's translator Monique Fleury Nagem states that Celeste's father left her mother while she was pregnant and went off to join the army. According to her autobiography, she was a lovable child whose mother doted on her and protected her from an abusive stepfather in her early childhood and teen years. Her earliest memories are about how her mother ran away from her stepfather in order to protect her daughter. But according to some accounts she was neglected by her mother.

Prostitution
Before she turned 16, Celeste had to run away from home when her mother's lover made inappropriate advances on her in her mother's absence. She waited many days on the roads for her mother to return before she was rescued by a prostitute but was later caught by the police and sent to a correction facility on charges of being under age and for being in company of a prostitute. At the correction facility she made friends with another young prostitute who later took her in when upon getting out of the correction facility, Celeste dejected by her mother's inability to leave her lover, decided to register herself as a prostitute. Celeste contracted small pox and was hospitalized for many days after which she decided to try her hand at singing and acting. In doing so, she wanted to have her name removed from the register of prostitutes At first, she faced many rejections and continued with her life of a courtesan with the help of her friends and one Dr. Adolph whom she loved. Adolph disappointed her in love which led her to ambition to outshine her rival.

Dancer
She learnt to dance by practicing at the Mabille dance hall with a man named Brididi who gave her the title Mogadore, saying that it would be easier to defend Mogadore against rivals as compared to Celeste. At the age of sixteen, she began performing at the Cirque Olympique. She helped introduce dances such as the quadrille and the can-can at the Bal Mabille. She is credited with being the first to dance the schottische. She also sang in cabarets, performing songs by Sebastián Iradier. One source has suggested that the character Carmen in Bizet's opera of the same name may have been based on Mogador.

Writer and director
In 1854, she married Lionel de Moreton, count of Chabrillan. He was named consul for France in Melbourne, Australia, and died there in 1858.  In 1854, she published a memoir Adieu au monde, Mémoires de Céleste Mogador. Her attorney Desmarest  convinced her to pen the story of how she worked her way out of poverty to rise to the top of the demi-monde. This memoir caused scandal in both Europe and Australia, where the courtesan-turned-countess had just relocated with her new husband. Although ostracized by her new community, she used the two years to work on her writing and to pen notes about her new life in a journal.   In 1877, she published it as Un deuil au bout du monde and it describes her experiences in Australia. She was disappointed that she could not find a publisher for Les Deux Noms, her third set of memoirs. Although lost for many years, Jana Verhoeven found them in France—and with the help of Alan Willey and Jeanne Allen, translated and annotated them.

She was director of a theatre company, the Folies-Marigny. Mogador also wrote a number of plays, including Les voleurs d'or, Les Crimes de la mer, Les Revers de l'Amour, L'Américaine and Pierre Pascal. Her friend Dumas père  helped her revise a stage version of her best-selling novel Les Voleurs d'or (1857). Her novel, La Sapho (1858), is her only fictional work to address the injustices from which demi-mondaines suffered.  In the novel, Marie Laurent is seduced and then abandoned. After a suicide attempt, she resurfaces as La Sapho in the London demi-monde and pursues revenge. Carol Mossman calls the novel a "vengeance fantasy" that allows de Chabrillan to work through the indignities she suffered as a prostitute: "If the justice sought by Céleste de Chabrillan in the course of her lifetime with respect to the social conditions leading her to her own prostitution  remains elusive, she can at least mete it out in fiction."

According to a review of her third set of memoirs, the widowed de Chabrillan confronted numerous difficulties: "There were powerful men who tried to crush Céleste's spirit with no concern for the dire financial consequences of their actions." Her memoirs painfully document her being denied a widow's pension even though her husband had worked as an important government employee. They also recount how the Chabrillan family tried to prevent her from publishing books, staging plays, and running her own theater. She usually managed to overcome such obstacles, but on several occasions, she toiled so hard that she ended up in the hospital.

While she emphasizes the personal hurdles she faced trying to prove herself to others, she also bears witness to the struggles of a female autodidact to achieve literacy and to improve her social standing in nineteenth-century France. Writing would buoy her through her darkest hours during the fifty years she soldiered on without her companion. Although Céleste took great pride in the twelve novels, thirty plays and operettas, and dozen poems and patriotic lyrics she authored, they never provided her with a stable income and, sadly, she struggled financially at several points in her life. Rich in ideas, however, Céleste boasts: "If my numerous works are not outstanding through their literary brilliance, they are so at least by their quantity. I have never imitated anyone and never borrowed from other writers. Maybe I was wrong, but what I wrote is truly mine." Likely cognizant of the critics who doubted whether a courtesan could really write, and certainly angered by the tendency of male writers to "kill off" courtesans at the end of their novels and plays, Céleste proudly recounted her life beyond prostitution and was ultimately recognized as a writer by her peers. As she notes in the last line of her memoirs, her greatest joy was the memory of "my illustrious protectors from the Association of Stage Authors, who accepted me as one of their own and granted me a pension until the end of my life."

Indeed, Mossman notes the respect her writing earned de Chabrillan: "If the publication of her memoirs in 1854-1858 shocked a reading public, the male half of which, in any case, participated with impunity in the very life she describes, other memoirs of notorious women would follow: The grande horizontale, Liane de Pougy, composed her Blue Notebooks from 1919-1937, Cora Pearl's memoirs appeared in 1886, and Sarah Bernhardt's fascinating but expurgated Ma double vie was written with considerable retrospective distance in 1907." The Evolution of the French Courtesan Novel also maintains that de Chabrillan's writings inspired other courtesans to protest their alienation in their own autobiographical fictions. For example, "Louise de la Bigne took up her pen to write courtesan fiction some 20 years later. She renamed herself Valtesse de la Bigne, enjoyed great fames in 1870s Paris, and took the pen name Ego when she published Isola." De la Bigne's novel in turn inspired Liane de Pougy to write four courtesan novels in fin-de-siècle Paris.

Generous and patriotic, during the Franco-Prussian War, she established Les Sœurs de France to look after wounded soldiers and she opened her home to children orphaned during the war. She earned a public tribute from the women who volunteered with her in the Sœurs de France.

The name "Mogador" refers to the 1844 bombardment of Mogador in Morocco, now known as Essaouira. She explains how she earned the moniker in her first set of memoirs when a suitor declared that winning over her was more difficult than conquering Mogador of Morocco. At one point in her life before marriage to Lionel, Celeste wanted to adopt a baby girl but was unable to do so because of her profession as a courtesan.

Death 
Mogador died in Montmartre, France, at the age of 84 on 18 February 1909.

Literary work 
Mogador wrote a series of novels:
Les Voleurs d'or (1857)
Sapho (1858)
Miss Pewell (1859)
Est-il fou? (1860)
Un miracle à Vichy (1861)
Mémoires d'une honnête fille (1865)
Les Deux Sœurs (1876)
Les Forçats de l'Amour (1881)

References

External links 
 
 
Courtesan and Countess: The Lost and Found Memoirs of the French Consul's Wife. Translated by Jana Verhoeven, Alan Willey and Jeanne Allen, Melbourne University Press, 2015. https://www.mup.com.au/books/courtesan-and-countess-hardback

1824 births
1909 deaths
French female dancers
French women novelists
French women dramatists and playwrights
Writers from Paris
19th-century French women writers
19th-century Australian women writers
French memoirists
19th-century theatre managers
19th-century French dancers
Courtesans from Paris
People of the Second French Empire
19th-century memoirists